Valčiūnai is a village in Vilnius district municipality, Lithuania. According to the 2011 census, it had population of 1,874.

References

Villages in Vilnius County
Vilnius District Municipality
Vilnius Voivodeship
Vilna Governorate
Wilno Voivodeship (1926–1939)